Eun Ji-won Hangul: 은지원, Hanja: 殷志源, (born June 8, 1978) is a South Korean rapper and entertainer. He is the leader of the first generation idol group Sechs Kies (젝스키스). 

He is recognized as an ancestor of the K-pop world, paving the way for hip-hop in the Korean pop scene. He is also considered an entertainment icon, popularly known as "Eun Choding" (Elementary Eun) for his childish on-screen persona on 1 Night 2 Days. In addition to his music, he continues to appear in shows like New Journey to the West.

Early life
Eun Jiwon was born in Seoul, South Korea on June 8, 1978. His mother, Kim Seong Ah, was a singer from the female duo, the "Lily Sisters". 

Eun studied abroad in Hawaii, attending the Hawaiian Mission Academy, from Grade 9 to 12. He was schoolmates with former Sechs Kies member, Kang Sung-hun. As a teen in Hawaii, he worked part time as a cafe DJ, where he picked up an interest in music and was recruited under DSP Media. 

He is related to Park Chung-hee and Park Geun-hye, who both served as the President of South Korea.

Career

1997–2000: Sechs Kies 

Eun Jiwon debuted under Sechskies on April 15, 1997 with their first single, "School Anthem" on the program KMTV Show! Music Tank. The team was met with positive reception and rose to fame with their hit songs PomSaengPomSa and Couple. Eun described his time with Sechs Kies as hectic due to back-to-back schedules paired with little rest. 

In 1998, Eun made his on-screen debut, playing the lead role in the film Seventeen, which also featured fellow Sechs Kies members.  

On May 18, 2000 Sechs Kies announced their disbandment. Despite their success, the group collectively to disband with hopes to succeed in the future. Following the disbandment, the group released a final track online, titled "Thanks". 

For more details regarding Sechs Kies' history see Sechs Kies.

Solo career

2000–2004: Solo debut and breakthrough 
Eun began his solo career on October 27, 2000 with the self composed mini album G. He continued to release dance music with the album G Pop, which was released on March 29, 2001. After the success of his first full album, Eun began to refine his style with his second album, Heavy G, his first full hip-hop album.

Under Waltz Music Entertainment he released his third album, Drunk in Hip Hop (including title track "Drunk in Melody") in September 6, 2003. The album was Eun's breakthrough into the hip-hop scene, solidifying his status as a rap artist and shedding his idol image. "Drunk in Melody" won Eun the Hip Hop Award at the 2003 SBS Gayo Awards and the KMTV Korean Music Awards. 

Eun repackaged his third album, including an alternate version of "Mi Casa Ro" and "Never, Ever" from his first solo album.

2004–2006: Acting and Hip-Hop
Eun starred in the romantic comedy Marrying a High-School Girl (여고생 시집가기) , which was released on December 23, 2004. The film was met with poor reviews and was criticized for its absurd plotline. Eun recounted that he was forced into the role, noting how he shaved his head in an act of rebellion against doing the film. 

Eun was a member of The Movement Crew (무브먼트), a hip-hop crew founded by Tiger JK, and performed at the group concert on May 13, 2006. Eun credits Tiger JK as a major influence in his musical style. His songs often feature fellow members including Drunken Tiger, Tasha (Yoon Mi Rae), Dynamic Duo and Bobby Kim.

2007–2010: Variety Television and GYM Entertainment
Eun returned with a single, "Adios," marking the beginning to his connection to Latin inspired music. His album Love, Death, Introspection (사랑 死랑 思랑) was released on October 30, 2007 with four new tracks and an instrumental version of "Adios". At this time, Eun joined the 13 Creative Unit, a subsidiary of Eyagi Entertainment.

After appearing steadily in small entertainment television roles, Eun joined the KBS reality-variety show1 Night 2 Days as a founding member. The show was met with nation-wide recognition and Eun became a staple household name. He was praised for his comedic personality as "Eun Choding" and continued to explore his career as a variety entertainer. 

In early 2009, Eun left CH Entertainment and founded his own company, GYM Entertainment. 

Eun released his fifth full-length studio album, Platonic, an electronic dance album. The title track, "Siren", was a homage to his fans as his "last" dance song ever. However, he would continue to release the single While Buzzed, another electronic dance song.

2011–2013: Clover and HotSechGodRG
On March 31, 2011, Eun Jiwon led a new group called Clover, including members Gilme and Mr. Tyfoon. Their debut song "La Vida Loca" was well-received, topping the Cyworld Music Chart just two weeks after the release. On September 29, 2011, Clover released another digital single, "A Guy Who I Know (아는 오빠)". In January 2012, Clover received Hip-Hop/Rap Award at the 21st Seoul Music Awards. On August 14, 2012, Clover released its second digital single, "Pork Soup (돼지국밥)". 
On November 18, 2013, Clover's third digital single, "Trickling (주르륵)" was released.

In 2013, Eun, Chun Myung-hoon, Tony An, Moon Hee-joon and Danny Ahn appeared on a new show on QTV called Handsome Boys of the 20th Century. The show was a performance project, forming the group HotSechGodRG — a portmanteau of each member's previous idol group names. The show received much attention and HotSechGodRG and the group continued to work together outside of the main show. They performed on various entertainment programs, such as Immortal Songs: Singing the Legend, Happy Together and Hwasin – Controller of the Heart (화신). 

In May 2014, it was announced that HotSechGodRG would return for a new show in July. Moon Hee-joon, Eun Ji-won, Danny Ahn, and Chun Myung Hoon starred in a new show called W.I.S.H. (Where is My Super Hero?), which was aired on OnStyle from July 19, 2014 to August 9, 2014.

2016: Sechs Kies reunion 

On the Saturday, Saturday's, I Am A Singer segment of the show Infinite Challenge, Sechs Kies held a reunion concert on September 10 and 11 at the Olympic Gymnastics Arena. The group re-banded and signed a contract under YG Entertainment.  The group's reunion went viral, sparking an influx of old and new fans to gather, resulting in their comeback concert tickets to sell out in only five minutes.

On October 7, SechsKies released a new digital single "Three Words (세 단어)" which topped all 8 major music charts shortly after release, achieving all-kill status. It also ranked high in Asian music charts and global iTunes in Taiwan and is among top tracks on iTunes charts in Hong Kong, Singapore, Malaysia, Thailand and more.

On November 23, YG announced that Sechs Kies' new album will be released on December 1, 2016. The new album "2016 Re-ALBUM" contains 10 past hit songs of SechsKies that were rearranged and remastered by YG producers, and is prepared a special gift for fans.

At the end of the year, Sechs Kies won several awards including Click! Star Wars Awards Hall of Fame, the 6th Gaon Chart Music Awards The Kpop Contribution of The Year, the 8th Melon Music Awards Hall of Fame, the 31st Golden Disc Awards Best Male Group Performance and the 26th Seoul Music Awards Bonsang.

2017–2018: The 20th Anniversary
On March 18, Eun Jiwon announced the re-opening of his official fan club '1KYNE'.

On April 19, YG announced that Sechs Kies' album The 20th Anniversary would be released on April 28, 2017. Along with the release of the album, the album topped multiple charts around the world, a new mark in their status as hallyu stars. Sechs Kies continued to hold consecutive wins for the title track "Be Well" on MBC Music Core and won #1 on KBS Music Bank.

On August 16, YG announced Eun Ji Won has officially signed individual contract with YG Entertainment.

2019: Solo comeback
On June 6, 2019, it was revealed the Eun would make a solo return to the music scene with his sixth album G1 on June 27. The lead single "I'm On Fire", featuring female vocalist Blue.D, was produced by YG producer Future Bounce and label-mate Winner's Mino, with lyrics written by Mino and Eun Ji-won himself.

2020–Present: Current Lineup and Future Plans

On January 28, 2020, Sechs Kies returned with their first mini album "All For You" following Kang Sung-hoon's withdrawal from the group. The group began to take a slower approach to music, leaning into ballads and old school R&B. The song won first place on Mnet M Countdown.

With their appearance on the variety program Three Meals for Four and with the help of Yoo Hee-yeol, the four starred in the project, Don't Look Back, documenting the making of the digital single "Don't Look Back," which was released on on February 5, 2021. The song topped major music charts in Korea, including Bugs, Genie, and Vibe. 

As of 2022, Eun continues to work as an entertainer on variety television, currently a fixed member on shows including Master in the House, Things That Make Me Groove Season 2, and Naked World History.

Personal life

2010: Marriage

In February 2010 Eun announced that he would marry his first love, a woman two years his senior. The two knew each other since 1994 and  reunited 13 years later, eventually getting married on April 20, 2010.  By marriage, Eun Jiwon and soccer player Lee Dong-Gook became brother-in-laws.

2013: Divorce announcement

On February 28, 2013, Eun announced that he and his wife divorced in August 2012 due to differences in personality.

Criticism
Eun is the only member of Sechs Kies to face criticism since the disbandment for changing his musical genre from pop music to hip hop.

Discography

Albums 
 2001: G Pop
 2002: Money
 2003: Eun Ji-won Best 
 2003:  Drunken in Hip Hop
 2005: The 2nd Round
 2009: Platonic
 2019: G1

Music credits

Filmography

Music Videos

Solo career

Film

Dramas

Host

Variety Shows

Endorsement

Radio career

Notes: Eun Jiwon was the first DJ on MBC FM4U (친한 친구), from 2002 to 2003.

Awards and nominations

References

External links
 

1978 births
K-pop singers
Living people
DSP Media artists
South Korean male idols
Sechs Kies members
South Korean Buddhists
South Korean male film actors
South Korean male television actors
South Korean male rappers
South Korean pop singers
South Korean singer-songwriters
YG Entertainment artists
Haengju Eun clan
Rappers from Seoul
South Korean male singer-songwriters
South Korean hip hop record producers